Motufala is an islet of the Nukunonu island group of Tokelau.

References

Islands of Tokelau
Pacific islands claimed under the Guano Islands Act
Nukunonu